Yugupa refers to the people of Yugo, Baltistan, a village in Gilgit–Baltistan, Pakistan. When used with a name to identify regional affiliation, the prefix -vi is added. Hence, Yuguvi. For instance if the name is Ali, then Ali Yuguvi will be the full name and regional affiliation title. It is common for people in Gilgit–Baltistan to use such titles as their real or working names.

See also
 Yugo, Baltistan
 Baltistan
 Balti people
 Balti language

Social groups of Pakistan
Baltistan